Berlin v. E.C. Publications, Inc., 329 F.2d 541 (2d Cir. 1964), was an important United States copyright law case decided by the United States Court of Appeals for the Second Circuit in 1964 involving the right to parody a well-known melody.

Mad magazine had published a special edition in 1961 titled More Trash from Mad No. 4, which featured a songbook containing 57 parody lyrics to existing popular songs, such as Irving Berlin's "A Pretty Girl is Like a Melody" (Mads version was the hypochondriac "Louella Schwartz Describes Her Malady"). In each case, readers were advised that the magazine's lyrics could be sung "to the tune of" the original compositions' titles.  Following the magazine's publication, several music corporations sued E.C. Publications, Inc. (the publisher of Mad magazine) over 25 of the 57 parodies.  The suit asked for one dollar per song for each issue of More Trash from Mad No. 4 that had been published, totaling $25 million in alleged damages. The cover of the special had borne the inadvertently prescient blurb, "For Solo or Group Participation (Followed by Arrest)."

Berlin was the named plaintiff, but the suit was brought not just by Irving Berlin Inc., but also by the music publishers Chappell, T.B. Harms, and Leo Feist.  Several of Berlin's compositions were at the heart of the dispute, but the complaint also cited songs by Jerome Kern, Cole Porter, Richard Rodgers, Lorenz Hart, and Oscar Hammerstein II.

The trial court found for Mad publisher E.C., establishing a legal precedent (the so-called "Mad magazine exception") protecting parody (but not, at that time, satire). The court ruled in E.C.'s favor on all but two of the parodies—"There's No Business Like No Business" and "Always"—whose lyrics were considered to revolve around the key words "business" and "always," and thus hewed too closely to the originals. For those two songs, the court denied summary relief to both parties. The other 23 parodies, such as "Louella Schwartz...", "The First Time I Saw Maris" and "The Horse That I'm Betting," were judged sufficiently distinct to qualify under "fair use."

The plaintiffs appealed to the Second Circuit, which ruled in Mads favor for all 25 songs, not just the 23 that had been cleared by the trial court. In his decision, Circuit Court Judge Irving Kaufman wrote:

The music companies sought review by the U.S. Supreme Court, which declined to grant certiorari and so sustained the circuit court's ruling.Federal Supplement, West's Federal Reporter; Second Series

Following the ruling, Mad went on to publish many hundreds of song parodies over the decades, including paperback collections.  In 2009, the magazine's most prolific rhyming parodist, Frank Jacobs, appeared in the sixth chapter of the PBS documentary Make 'em Laugh: The Funny Business of America singing "Blue Cross," his parody of Berlin's "Blue Skies" (and health insurance) that had appeared in the original 1961 collection.

Parodies from Sing Along with MADWritten by Irving Berlin: 
"You’re Just in Love"—parodied as "That’s the Way Payola Goes"
"Easter Parade" -- "Beauty Parade"
"There’s No Business Like Show Business" -- "There’s No Business Like No Business"
"Blue Skies" -- "Blue Cross"
"Always" -- "Always"
"A Pretty Girl is Like a Melody" -- "Louella Schwartz Describes Her Malady"
"The Girl That I Marry"   "The Horse That I’m Betting"
"Cheek to Cheek" -- "Sheik to Sheik"Written by Jerome Kern: 
"Who"—parodied as "Luce"
"The Last Time I Saw Paris" -- "The First Time I Saw Maris"
"Smoke Gets in Your Eyes" -- "Castro Told Us Lies"Written by Cole Porter: 
"I’ve Got You Under My Skin"—parodied as "I Swat You Hard on the Skin"
"Begin the Beguine" -- "When They Bring In the Machine"
"Anything Goes" -- "Anything Goes"
"You’re the Top" -- "You’re the Top"
"Let’s Do It" -- "Let’s Do It"
"I Get a Kick Out of You" -- "I Get a Kick-Back From You"  
"It’s All Right with Me" -- "To Get More Salary"Written by Richard Rodgers, with Lorenz Hart or Oscar Hammerstein II''': 
"Where Or When"—parodied as "Where Or When"
"It Might As Well Be Spring" -- "I’m Glad That You Can’t Sing"
"A Cockeyed Optimist" --"A Nuclear Physicist"
"There’s a Small Hotel" -- "There’s a Small Canal" 
"Oklahoma" -- "Albert Einstein"   
"My Funny Valentine" -- "My Padded Overtime"    
"Shall We Dance?" -- "Shall We Strike?"   
"Hello, Young Lovers" -- "Hello, Young Doctors"
"I Whistle a Happy Tune" -- "I Tell ‘Em They’ve Got a Bug"
"My Heart Stood Still" -- "My Dreams Were Killed"
"Manhattan" -- "I’ll Have Nairobi"
"Oh, What a Beautiful Morning" -- "Oh, What a Beautiful Beefsteak"

The plaintiffs held the publishing rights to 30 of the 57 songs that had been parodied by Mad.  Other than the six parodies specifically cited in the two judges' rulings -- "The First Time I Saw Maris", "Louella Schwartz Describes Her Malady", "I Swat You Hard on the Skin", "Blue Cross", "Always", and "There's No Business Like Show Business"—it is unclear which 19 of the plaintiffs' remaining 24 songs were in dispute.

Frank Jacobs wrote 23 of the parodies, whose topics ranged from nuclear physics to automation to the Philadelphia Phillies.  Larry Siegel wrote another 23, on subjects from overcrowded classrooms to the 1960 Nixon-Kennedy debate to books about Hitler.  The remaining 11 song parodies were credited to "The Editors."  All of Jacobs' contested parodies were later included in the 2015 book collection MAD's Greatest Writers: Frank Jacobs.

 See also   Campbell v. Acuff-Rose Music, Inc.''  
Mad magazine#Controversy and lawsuit

References

United States copyright case law
United States Court of Appeals for the Second Circuit cases
1964 in United States case law
Fair use case law
Irving Berlin
Mad (magazine)
United States lawsuits
Sing-along